The 2022 Rancho Santa Fe Open was a professional tennis tournament played on outdoor hard courts. It was the twelfth edition of the tournament which was part of the 2022 ITF Women's World Tennis Tour. It took place in Rancho Santa Fe, California, United States between 3 and 9 October 2022.

Champions

Singles

  Marcela Zacarías def.  Katrina Scott, 6–1, 6–2

Doubles

  Elvina Kalieva /  Katarzyna Kawa def.  Giuliana Olmos /  Marcela Zacarías, 6–1, 3–6, [10–2]

Singles main draw entrants

Seeds

 1 Rankings are as of 26 September 2022.

Other entrants
The following players received wildcards into the singles main draw:
  Dalayna Hewitt
  Elvina Kalieva
  Janice Tjen

The following player received a special exempt into the singles main draw:
  Robin Montgomery

The following players received entry from the qualifying draw:
  Alex Eala
  Hsu Chieh-yu
  Hina Inoue
  Ellen Perez
  Urszula Radwańska
  Anna Rogers
  Storm Sanders
  Ena Shibahara

The following player received entry as a lucky loser:
  Adriana Reami

References

External links
 2022 Rancho Santa Fe Open at ITFtennis.com
 Official website

2022 ITF Women's World Tennis Tour
2022 in American tennis
October 2022 sports events in the United States